The Dow Great Lakes Bay Invitational is a women's professional golf tournament on the LPGA Tour that is played in Michigan. A new event in 2019, it is held at Midland Country Club in Midland, Michigan. It is a team event, similar to the Zurich Classic of New Orleans on the PGA Tour, with alternate shot (foursome) in the first and third rounds and better ball (fourball) for the second and fourth rounds. Dow Chemical Company is the title sponsor.

The 2020 edition was canceled due to the COVID-19 pandemic. For the 2021 edition, the purse was increased to $2.3 million, with the first-place team splitting $559,000.

For 2022, the purse was increased to $2.5 million, with the first-place team splitting $607,620.

Winners

References

External links

Coverage on the LPGA Tour's official site

LPGA Tour events
Golf in Michigan
Recurring sporting events established in 2019
2019 establishments in Michigan
Women's sports in Michigan